Bicyclus zinebi, the western large bush brown, is a butterfly in the family Nymphalidae. It is found in Senegal, the Gambia, Guinea-Bissau, Guinea, Sierra Leone, Liberia, Ivory Coast and Ghana. The habitat consists of forests (especially drier forests).

The larvae feed on Afromomum latifolium.

References

Elymniini
Butterflies described in 1869
Butterflies of Africa
Taxa named by Arthur Gardiner Butler